Mugilogobius sarasinorum, Sarasin's goby, is a species of goby endemic to Lake Poso in Sulawesi, Indonesia.  This species can reach a length of  TL.  It is important to local commercial fisheries and the fishing community.

Etymology
The fish is named in honor of Swiss naturalist-ethnologist Paul Sarasin (1856-1929) and his cousin, naturalist Fritz Sarasin (1859-1942), who collected the type specimens.

References

Sarasin's goby
Freshwater fish of Sulawesi
Taxa named by George Albert Boulenger
Sarasin's goby
Taxonomy articles created by Polbot